Jean-Michel Rouzière (died 13 February 1989) was a French comic actor and theatre head.

Life 
He headed the théâtre du Palais-Royal from 1965 then headed the Théâtre des Variétés from 1975. He was made a knight of the Légion d'Honneur.

Filmography 
 1942: Vie privée (by Walter Kapps)
 1952: Jocelyn 
 1954: Les Intrigantes (by Henri Decoin) - Jean, le garçon du restaurant (uncredited)
 1954: Madame du Barry (by Christian-Jaque) - (uncredited)
 1954: Le Rouge et le Noir (by Claude Autant-Lara)
 1954: Bonnes à tuer
 1957: L'honorable Mr. Pepys 
 1958: Cette nuit-là - (uncredited)
 1959: Pourquoi viens-tu si tard?
 1959: Le Bossu (by André Hunebelle)
 1960: Le Capitan (by André Hunebelle) - Un gentilhomme de la province
 1961: Les Amours de Paris
 1961: Les Godelureaux - (uncredited)
 1961: Le Miracle des loups - Un soldat (uncredited)
 1962: Portrait-robot 
 1963: Le Vice et la Vertu - SS Man
 1963: Blague dans le coin
 1964: Le Bluffeur
 1964: Requiem pour un caïd
 1965: Le Vampire de Düsseldorf
 1965: Paris vu par... - Jean-Marc (segment "Place de l'Etoile")
 1966: Paris brûle-t-il? - Le monsieur au petit chien
 1968: Mayerling - Police superintendent
 1971: Le Cinéma de papa - Le représentant de la Colombia (final film role)

Theatre 
Actor
 1959 : Le Cas Dobedatt by George Bernard Shaw, producer Jean Mercure, Théâtre des Bouffes-Parisiens
 1959 : Le Client du matin by Brendan Behan, producer Georges Wilson, Théâtre de l'Œuvre
 1962 : Au petit bonheur by Marc-Gilbert Sauvajon, producer Jean-Michel Rouzière, Théâtre des Nouveautés

Producer
 1962 : Au petit bonheur by Marc-Gilbert Sauvajon, Théâtre des Nouveautés
 1965 : Gigi by Colette, Théâtre du Palais-Royal
 1982 : Lorsque l’enfant paraît by André Roussin, Théâtre des Variétés

External links 
 

1989 deaths
French male film actors
Year of birth missing
French male stage actors
Chevaliers of the Légion d'honneur
French theatre managers and producers
20th-century French male actors